The 2010 Total 24 Hours of Spa was the 63rd running of the Spa 24 Hours.  Following the break-up of the FIA GT Championship, the 2010 running of the Spa 24 Hours served as part of the FIA GT2 European Cup, with cars from the GT3, GT4, and national-level GT categories also being allowed to participate. Due to a transaxle gearbox the BMW M3 GT2 was not allowed to compete in the GT2 class, forcing them to race in GTN instead. This was the last year GT2 cars were eligible for the race.

Shortly after the start it was becoming a 3-class car battle with the #2 Ferrari, #50 Audi and #79 BMW. The #2 Ferrari with Gianmaria Bruni behind the wheel quickly build up a sizeable gap over the rest of the field, but small problems threw them back to 2nd position. Shortly into the night the second place #2 Ferrari and the 3rd place #50 Audi collided and both cars were retired. Late into the night, the safety car gave a one lap advantage to the lead BMW. The positions remained there until the last half hour of the race when the #79 BMW got a suspension problem and went straight into Pouhon, allowing the two Porsches to take the two top spots. The race was won by the BMS Scuderia Italia Porsche, the second 24 Hours of Spa victory for the team and fifth for the manufacturer. Local team Mühlner Motorsport also earned Porsche the GT3 category win after all the leading Audis and Ford retired. Aston Martin's Jota Sport won the GT4 category.

Qualifying

Qualifying result
Class leaders are in bold, the fastest lap for each car is in gray.

Race

Race result

References

External links
 Official Website (French) (Dutch)

Spa
24 Hours of Spa
Spa 24 Hours